Leandro Camilo de Almeida (born February 9, 1986) is a Brazilian footballer who plays as a centre-back for Brasil de Pelotas.

Trophies
Campeonato Paraense Champions :
Paysandu Sport Club : 1 (2009–10)

References

External links

1986 births
Association football defenders
Brazilian footballers
Brazilian expatriate footballers
Brazilian expatriate sportspeople in Indonesia
Expatriate footballers in Indonesia
Liga 1 (Indonesia) players
Living people
Pelita Bandung Raya players
Campinense Clube players
Paysandu Sport Club players
São Bernardo Futebol Clube players
Comercial Futebol Clube (Ribeirão Preto) players
Brasiliense Futebol Clube players
Boa Esporte Clube players
Rio Branco Football Club players
Audax Rio de Janeiro Esporte Clube players
Clube Esportivo Lajeadense players
Grêmio Esportivo Brasil players